Jean Bouise (3 June 1929 – 6 July 1989) was a French actor.

He was born in Le Havre. In the 1950s he helped to found Théâtre de la Cité, and was a player in the company. He entered films in the 1960s, and played a supporting roles in The Shameless Old Lady, Z, L'Aveu, Out 1, The Return of the Tall Blond Man with One Black Shoe, Section spéciale, and Monsieur Klein. He received César nominations for his roles in Le vieux fusil and Le Juge Fayard dit Le Shériff, before winning the Best Supporting Actor award for Coup de tête. Subsequently, he appeared in Édith et Marcel, Le Dernier Combat, Subway, The Big Blue and La Femme Nikita. He died in Lyon.

Filmography

References

External links 

1929 births
1989 deaths
French male stage actors
French male film actors
20th-century French male actors
Male actors from Le Havre
Male actors from Lyon
Best Supporting Actor César Award winners